Katan was a thin silk cloth. It was made of double twisted yarns of pure silk yarns in warp and weft both.

Texture 
Katan was a superfine, delicate cloth. It is said that ''The cloth goes to the pieces when exposed to the moonlight''

Brocade 

Mentions 
European Katan is mentioned in the Ain-i-Akbari in silk stuffs.

References 

Silk
Woven fabrics